James Ware may refer to:

Medicine
 James Ware (ophthalmologist) (1756–1815), English eye surgeon and Fellow of Royal Society
 James Ware (surgeon) (1941–2015), British surgeon and medical educator

Politics
 James Britton Ware (1830–1918), American senator from Georgia
 James Franklin Ware (1849–?), American politician

Sports
 Jim Ware (hurler) (1908–1983), Irish hurler
 Jim Ware (basketball) (1944–1986), American professional basketball player
 James Ware (born 1958), American professional wrestler better known as Koko B. Ware

Other
 James Ware (historian) (1594–1666), Irish historian
 James Redding Ware (1832–1900s), British novelist and playwright
 James E. Ware (1846–1918), American architect
 James H. Ware (1941–2016), American biostatistician and Dean of Harvard T.H. Chan School of Public Health
 James Ware (judge) (born 1946), United States district judge